Trampot is a commune in the Vosges department of Lorraine in northeastern France.

Geography

Trampot is located at the border of the Haute-Marne departement.

The village is crossed by the Route nationale 427, which links it to Joinville (28 km) and Liffol-le-Grand (13 km).

History 
1820 : Project of fusion of the villages of Trampot and Brechainville
1839 : Route Nationale 427 was built
1923 : Electricity arrives on the village
1957 : Creation of the village school
1986 : Closing of the village school

Mayors of Trampot

Monuments 
 The church Saint Paul and Saint Pierre has been a historical monument since 3 September 2010.

Personalities linked to the commune

See also
Communes of the Vosges department

References

Communes of Vosges (department)